Sycewice is a PKP railway station in Sycewice (Pomeranian Voivodeship), Poland.

Lines crossing the station

Train services
The station is served by the following services:

Regional services (R) Słupsk — Koszalin
Regional services (R) Słupsk — Koszalin — Kołobrzeg
Regional services (R) Słupsk — Koszalin — Szczecin Główny
Regional services(R) Słupsk — DarłowoPolregio. PR 80997 Słupsk — Darłowo. Timetable. https://bilety.polregio.pl/pociag/REG/80997

References 

Railway stations in Pomeranian Voivodeship
Słupsk County